The Given Institute in Aspen Colorado was built to house the Advances in Molecular Biology Conference sponsored by the University of Colorado School of Medicine. This Conference on medical research was in keeping with the tradition of "The Aspen Idea" creating a space for thinkers, leaders, artists and musicians from all over the world to join together in a setting that feeds the "Mind, Body and Spirit".

History of the conference 

The first Conference was held in the Aspen Middle School gymnasium in 1964. Dr. Donald West King then Chairman of the Department of Pathology at the University of Colorado Medical School was the original organizer of the Conference. The purpose of the Conference was to create a place where faculty, fellows and residents could discuss developments in newly emerging field of biomedical research Other sponsors of the Conference were the National Institute of Health, the National Research Council, and the National Academy of Scientists.

As the popularity of the conference increased it grew to 4 sessions per summer. It was reported in the 1967 Aspen Times that several thousand potential attendees were denied due to the lack of meeting space.

Building 

That same year, negotiations started with the Aspen Institute to develop a permanent conference facility with a laboratory attached. The 2+ acres of land overlooking Hallam Lake were sold to the University of Colorado by Elizabeth Paepcke for half its market value. Dr. King negotiated with the Irene Heinz Given (daughter of H. J. Heinz) and John LaPorte Given Foundation for construction funds. A $500,000 donation was secured and the building named in honor of the Given Foundation. Other donations towards construction costs came from Harvard University and other schools. 

Mrs. Paepcke was also instrumental in contracting fellow Chicagoan and Cranbrook alumni architect Harry Weese to design the new building. Mr. Weese had recently designed the Arena Stage Fichhandler and Kreeger stages for Zelda Fichandler. 

Both in plan and façade, geometries of circles, squares, and triangles are deliberately interwoven, juxtaposed, and pushed beyond the boundary of the square. When it was completed, architecture critic Janet Bloom noted: “The basic square of the plan is maintained by brick terracing. But the dominance of the full circle can be enjoyed from at least three sides. As Harry Weese puts it, they ‘extracted as much from the three-dimensional possibilities’ as they could, especially by nudging the circle a little beyond the boundaries of the square. The porthole windows are reminders of the circle where it is least apparent.”'

Historical use 

Until the late 1980s facility maintenance costs were provided by the National Institutes of Health and other donations. When the NIH support ended maintenance costs were entirely borne by the University of Colorado School of Medicine.

The Given Institute currently hosts 10 free public lectures a year and numerous lectures from experts in various fields including bio-terrorism to sports medicine. Several other non-profit organizations use the Institute as a Conference center including the Aspen Valley Medical Foundation, the Aspen Global Change Institute, the  Aspen Film Festival, the Aspen Writers Foundation, the Himalayan Rescue Association The Aspen Center for Environmental Studies

Epilogue 

The Given Institute was sold and demolished by the University of Colorado School of Medicine in April 2011.

References

Further reading 

 The University of Colorado School of Medicine: A Millennial History by Henry N. Claman, Robert H. Shikes
 Process:Architecture Magazine No. 11, Harry Weese: Humanism and Tradition 
 National Trust for Historic Preservation| National Trust for Historic Preservation Aspen Modern
 The City of Aspen
 The Historic Preservation Commission for the City of Aspen
 Architects + Artisans
 The University of Colorado School of Medicine
The Aspen Times
HPC meeting Harry Teague's presentation video

External links 
  Greg Watts Photographs of the Given Institute
 "Help Save the Given Institute" Facebook Group
"In Aspen, the Value of Architecture" Huffington Post
 Aspen Given Foundation

Buildings and structures in Aspen, Colorado
Harry Weese buildings